The Master of the Saint Bartholomew Altarpiece (sometimes called the Master of the Saint Bartholomew Altar,) was an Early Netherlandish painter active in Germany, mostly Cologne, between 1475/1480 and 1510.  Despite his anonymity, he is one of the most recognizable artists of the early Renaissance period in German art.

It has been said that the Master is the last "Gothic" painter to be active in Cologne.  Approximately twenty-five paintings have been attributed to him on the basis of his highly individual style, which does not seem to bear any affinity to that of any other school then active locally. Despite the fact that he seems to have been the leading painter of his time in Cologne, no evidence of any followers, or of a school in the usual sense, may be found.

 
A number of influences, mainly Netherlandish, have been traced in the Master's paintings.  These include Dirck Bouts and Rogier van der Weyden, whose influence may be seen in the Munich Madonna and Child with Saint Anne.  Stylistically, the Master's paintings are characterized by their use of bright, enamel-like colors and an affinity to the International Gothic style of painting.

Career
Almost nothing is known of his life, including his name; nevertheless, his hand is distinctive enough that scholars have found it fairly easy to trace his career.  His name is derived from an altarpiece dated to between 1505 and 1510, depicting Saint Bartholomew flanked by Saint Agnes and Saint Cecilia.  The painting is known to have hung in the church of St. Kolumba, Cologne; the inclusion of a Carthusian monk in the picture indicates a possible connection to the Carthusian monastery in that city.  The identity of the Master remains unknown; it has been suggested, given the number of commissions he executed for the Carthusian order, that he may have been a member himself.

It is now believed that, despite his associations with Cologne, and with German artistic circles, elements of his style suggest that the Master was initially trained in the Netherlands - a point of origin in Utrecht, or in the Gelderland region, has been posited. A Book of Hours, open to an identifiably middle Netherlandish text, in the hand of Saint Columba in a panel attributed to the Master conserved at Mainz, offers a clue to his cultural origins. It is further suggested that he emigrated to Cologne in about 1480.  His early style may be seen in the miniatures he painted for the Book of Hours of Sophia van Bylant; the Flagellation in this collection is dated to 1475, the earliest date associated with the Master.  The calendar in the book is that of the diocese of Utrecht; nevertheless, certain oddities of language indicate an affinity with Arnhem, which was also the home of the donor.  

Other early works, dated to the 1480s, include an Adoration of the Kings and a Madonna and Child with Saint Anne, both of which exhibit affinities with northern Netherlandish painting and may have been created in the Netherlands.  Among the very few works attributed to the Master for which the original location is documented are a pair of altarpieces commissioned for the Carthusian monastery in Cologne by a lawyer, Dr. Peter Rinck, and the Deposition, now at the Musée du Louvre, that was executed for the hospital of the Antonite brothers in Paris.

Collections
The Master's work may be found in a number of international museum collections.  Three panels from the altarpiece which gave him his name are in the Alte Pinakothek in Munich, and the Deposition for the Order of St Anthony is at the Musée du Louvre. There are four works in the National Gallery, London and a double-sided panel of the Journey of the Magi (or Three Kings) and the Assumption of Mary at the J. Paul Getty Museum in Los Angeles.  A Baptism of Christ is in the National Gallery of Art, Washington, D.C.  Other paintings are in the Museum of Fine Arts, Boston; the Philadelphia Museum of Art; and the Wallraf-Richartz Museum in Cologne.  A Death of the Virgin formerly in Berlin is now lost.

Gallery

Notes and references

Further reading
in English
Neil MacGregor: Victim of Anonymity. Master of the Saint Bartholomew Altarpiece. Walter Neurath Memorial Lecture Series. Thames & Hudson, London 1993. .

in German
Rainer Budde, Roland Krischel (Hrsg.): Genie ohne Namen. Der Meister des Bartholomäus-Altars. Verlag DuMont und Wallraf-Richartz-Museum, Köln 2001. . (Katalog zur Sonderausstellung im Wallraf-Richartz-Museum – Fondation Corboud, Köln, 20. Mai bis 19. August 2001, ergänzt um zahlreiche weitere Abbildungen)
Rainer Budde, Roland Krischel (Hrsg.): Das Stundenbuch der Sophia van Bylant, Köln 2001
Henri L. Defoer: Der Meister des Bartholomäus-Altars und die Kunst der Nördlichen Niederlande, Betrachtungen anlässlich einer Ausstellung, Wallraf-Richartz-Jahrbuch: Jahrbuch für Kunstgeschichte 64 (2003), S. 215-241.
Dagmar Eichberger: Rezension der Veröffentlichung von Budde/Krischel: Genie ohne Namen. Der Meister des Bartholomäus-Altars in: sehepunkte 2 (2002), Nr. 3, 15.03.2002, URL: .
Regina Urban: Der Meister des Bartholomäus-Altars. Eine Bedeutungsstudie zu Thomas-, Kreuz- und Bartholomäus-Altar vor dem Hintergrund der kartäusischen Auftraggeber. Unveröff. Magisterarbeit an der TU Berlin, Fachgebiet Kunstgeschichte, Berlin 1988
Regina Urban: Der Meister des heiligen Bartholomäus. Untersuchungen zur Kleidung, Gestik und Vorbilderverarbeitung im Oeuvre des Malers. Berlin, Techn. Univ., Diss., 1997
Paul Pieper: Das Stundenbuch des Bartholomäus-Meisters. In: Beiträge zur Kunstgeschichte Westfalens; 2. Im Auftrag des Freundeskreises des Westfälischen Landesmuseums für Kunst- und Kulturgeschichte e.V. hrsg. und eingel. von Eva Pieper-Rapp-Frick. Münster, 2000, S. 501-533.
Neue Deutsche Biographie (NDB), Bd. 16, S. 708f.

External links
Analysis of the Master's work 
Article about his work 

''This article is based in part on a translation of the corresponding article in the Italian Wikipedia.
Biography at the National Gallery of Art
Biography at the Getty Museum

15th-century births
16th-century deaths
15th-century German painters
16th-century German painters
Saint Bartholomew Altarpiece, Master of the
Early Netherlandish painters